Hear Both Sides is an 1803 comedy play by the British writer Thomas Holcroft.

The original Drury Lane cast included William Dowton as Fairfax, John Bannister as Transit, Charles Kemble as Headlong, Richard Suett as Sir Charles Aspell, Richard Wroughton as Stewart, Alexander Webb as Sir Luke Lostall, Thomas Hollingsworth as Robert, Ralph Wewitzer as Bailiff, Jane Pope as Caroline and Dorothea Jordan as Eliza.

References

Bibliography
 Nicoll, Allardyce. A History of Early Nineteenth Century Drama 1800-1850. Cambridge University Press, 2009.

1803 plays
Comedy plays
West End plays
Plays by Thomas Holcroft